Guillermo Ricardo Hernández Medina (born 18 February 1971) is a Mexican football manager and former player.

References

Living people
1971 births
Mexican footballers
Mexico international footballers
Association football defenders
C.D. Guadalajara footballers
C.D. Veracruz footballers
Tecos F.C. footballers
Correcaminos UAT footballers
Querétaro F.C. footballers
Liga MX players
Ascenso MX players
Mexican football managers
Footballers from Guadalajara, Jalisco